Kokopelli is the second album by British band Kosheen released in the UK through Moksha Recordings on 11 August 2003. The album saw the band lean towards the rock music genre.

Band member Darren Beale states they named the album after a Native American deity named Kokopelli. He states that "He was a spiritual character and he used to travel from the all villages and reservations to spread fertility, you know, to make their crops grow. I suppose he was like a witch doctor as well and he used to do some music and dance. We were kind of into American history and culture anyway but then Sian was reading about this guy and we thought we'd link it to that."

Track listing 
All songs written by Darren Beale, Sian Evans and Markee Substance.
 "Wasting My Time" – 5:08
 "All in My Head" (radio edit) – 4:06 *
 "Crawling" – 3:53
 "Avalanche" – 6:16
 "Blue Eyed Boy" – 4:50
 "Suzy May" – 5:31
 "Swamp" – 3:37 (UK bonus track)
 "Wish" – 5:10
 "Coming Home" – 5:29
 "Ages" – 5:48
 "Recovery" – 5:39
 "Little Boy" – 3:35

 Despite being listed as a radio edit, a longer version of "All in My Head" was never available (not counting remixes).

Charts

Release history

References

2003 albums
Kosheen albums